Darreh Mianeh-ye Olya (also Romanized as Darreh Mīāneh-ye ‘Olyā and Darreh Miyaneh Olya; also known as Darreh Meyāneh-ye Bālā, Darreh Mīāneh, and Darreh Mīāneh-ye Bālā) is a village in Kamazan-e Sofla Rural District, Zand District, Malayer County, Hamadan Province, Iran. At the 2006 census, its population was 420, in 99 families.

References 

Populated places in Malayer County